Master of Zen also known as Bodhidharma is a 1994 Hong Kong film based on the legends surrounding the life of Bodhidharma. The film was directed, produced, and co-written by Brandy Yuen, and starred Derek Yee and Louis Fan in the leading roles.

Plot
Bodhidharma was born in India sometime in the fifth or sixth century as the third son of a king. When his father died, he leaves home and practises Buddhism under the tutelage of the master Prajnatara. Many decades later, he travels to China to spread Zen Buddhism and search for a successor.

In China, Bodhidharma meets Emperor Wu of the Liang dynasty and tells him he has not accumulated any merit even though the emperor has made many financial contributions to the Buddhist community. The emperor is displeased by Bodhidharma's comment. The locals are also not very friendly towards Bodhidharma, but he surprises them on one occasion when he saves a girl from drowning, and crosses a river by using qinggong and with the aid of a reed. Bodhidharma eventually arrives at Shaolin Monastery and settles down in a cave in the backhill. He faces the wall and enters a state of meditation for nine years. He did not move at all throughout those years and many people came to look at him when they heard about it.

Shenguang is a former soldier who has given up violence and become a Buddhist monk to seek peace and redemption. After experiencing strange visions, he makes his way to Shaolin and kneels outside the cave under heavy snowfall. By then, Bodhidharma has awakened from his meditation and he accepts Shenguang as his apprentice after Shenguang cuts off his left arm to show his sincerity. Bodhidharma renames Shenguang to "Huike".

Bodhidharma fends off a group of thugs trying to rob the Shaolin monks and miraculously survives after being set on fire. The robbers retreat in shame when they realise they cannot harm this holy man. After witnessing the Shaolin monks' inability to protect themselves, Bodhidharma teaches them martial arts, which later evolved into Shaolin Kung Fu. In his old age, he wishes to return to India so he gathers his students and tests their understanding of his teachings. He eventually chooses Huike to be his successor.

In the final scene, Bodhidharma is seen walking away with a single shoe dangling from his staff. He meets a peasant, who greets him. The peasant later goes to Shaolin to tell a monk that he met Bodhidharma earlier, but the monk says Bodhidharma died three years ago. To verify the truth, they open Bodhidharma's coffin and are surprised to see that it is empty, except for the other shoe.

Cast
 Derek Yee as Bodhidharma
 Louis Fan as Shenguang / Huike
 Chan Chung-yung as Keyura
 Wu Ma as Shenguang's master
 Fan Mei-sheng as fat monk
 Eddy Ko as Bodhidharma's father
 Austin Wai as Bodhidharma's brother
 Yuen Mo
 Brandy Yuen
 Silver Cheung
 Garry Chan

Reception
Mark Pollard wrote in a review on the website Kung Fu Cinema:

Attribution
Chen Sing is a 1st role from the 1977 film Shaolin monk/A.K.A.Shaolin Tamo Buddhist Monk.

References

External links
 
 

1994 films
Hong Kong fantasy films
Kung fu films
1990s Cantonese-language films
Films about Buddhism
1994 fantasy films
1990s Hong Kong films